John Dahlbäck (born October 13, 1985) is a Swedish house music producer and DJ. He has released five albums and uses a variety of stage names. He has also collaborated with his cousin Jesper Dahlbäck in duo musical projects under the name Hugg & Pepp and Pepp & Kaliber.

Musical career
Dahlbäck is also the owner of Pickadoll Records as well as Mutants Records, with releases by, apart from his own work, artists like Sébastien Léger and Dada Life on Pickadoll, and Lunde Bros, Albin Myers and others on Mutants. He has recorded minimal techno under the alias Hug and as Hugg&Pepp together with his cousin and fellow producer Jesper Dahlbäck. Remixes include Kleerup's "Longing for Lullabies" and Alanis Morissette's "Underneath".

He made an appearance with a set on Pete Tong's The Essential Mix on BBC Radio 1 on 4 October 2008.

Dahlbäck's first artist album Mutants was released in May 2010 and had various releases on labels such as Dim Mak, Spinnin, Big Beat, Mix Mash, Tool Room and Ultra Records

Discography

Albums

Studio albums
2005: Shades of Shadow
2005: Man From the Fall
2006: At The Gun Show
2008: Winners & Fools
2010: Mutants
2012: Kill The Silence (as Demure) 
2016: Saga
2018: Find a Home
2022: to the sky

Compilation albums
2005: Warsteiner Club World Club And Lounge Volume 1
2007: Pickadoll's
2007: Mar T, Les Schmitz, John Dahlback: Amnesia Ibiza The Best Global Club
2009: Clubbers Guide Ibiza '09
2009: Greatest Hug's
2010: Mutants
2012: Toolroom Knights (Mixed By John Dahlbäck)

Extended plays

As lead artist

As MyBack (with Albin Myers)

Singles

As lead artist

As MyBack (with Albin Myers)

Notes
 Note 1: Credited with the individual names Dählback and Myers
 Note 2: Named "Original Summerburst Anthem 2015"

As Jovicii (with Avicii)

Music videos

As lead artist

As MyBack (with Albin Myers)

References

External links
 Official site
 
 

Swedish house musicians
1985 births
Living people
Swedish DJs
Progressive house musicians
Electronic dance music DJs